The generic term for condiments in the Filipino cuisine is sawsawan (Philippine Spanish: sarsa). Unlike sauces in other Southeast Asian regions, most sawsawan are not prepared beforehand, but are assembled on the table according to the preferences of the diner.

Description
In the Philippines, the common condiments aside from salt and pepper are vinegar, soy sauce, calamansi, and patis. The combination and different regional variations of these simple sauces make up the various common dipping sauces in the region.

The most common type of sawsawan is the toyomansi (or toyo't kalamansi), which is a mixture of soy sauce, calamansi, and native Siling labuyo. It can also be seasoned with vinegar and patis (fish sauce). This sauce is typically served with roasted meat dishes.

A similar dipping sauce used for grilled meats like inihaw is toyo, suka, at sili (literally "soy sauce, vinegar, and chili"). It is made of soy sauce, vinegar, and siling labuyo with some opting to add diced onions and/or garlic and a seasoning of sugar and/or black pepper. For serving with grilled fish, it is typically garnished with diced tomatoes, patis (fish sauce), or more rarely, bagoong (fermented shrimp or fish).

The simplest dipping sauce, for example, is vinegar mixed with another ingredient like siling labuyo (sukang may sili), garlic (suka't bawang), soy sauce (sukang may toyo), and so on. This can be elaborated further by adding a range of spices and even fruits, resulting in dipping sauces like sinamak (spiced vinegar). Suka Pinakurat is a popular brand of spiced vinegar in the Philippines.

All of these do not have set recipes, however, and can use ingredients and proportions interchangeably according to what is available and to the preference of the diner.

Other notable ingredients added to these kinds of sawsawan include shallots, whole black peppercorns, sugar, siling haba, wansoy (cilantro), ginger, and so on. Sawsawan are also unique in that they can function as marinades.

Some sauces need to be prepared beforehand like the traditional Filipino sweet and sour sauce agre dulce (or agri dulci) which is made from cornstarch, salt, sugar, and tomato or banana ketchup. When made with hot peppers like siling labuyo, it becomes a sweet chili sauce. It is the traditional dipping sauces of fried dishes like lumpia or okoy.  A similar sauce used for fried street food appetizers is known simply as "manong's sauce". It is made with flour or cornstarch, sugar, soy sauce, garlic, chilis, ground pepper, and muscovado or brown sugar.

Another spicy condiment used for street food is the "chili garlic sauce" made from minced chilis, especially siling labuyo, and fried garlic. Some add powdered dried shrimp or finely minced meat to the sauce. It is usually consumed with siomai as a sauce made with soy sauce and typically spritzed with calamansi.

Among the Maranao people, another notable condiment is the palapa, a very spicy condiment made from sakurab (native scallions), ginger, turmeric, and chilis. It is an ubiquitous accompaniment to Maranao meals.

For seafood dishes, another common condiment is taba ng talangka (also called aligue, "roe", colloquially). This is a savory paste derived from crab roe or fat preserved in garlic and oil, with other ingredients like calamansi, vinegar, and others. It is typically sauteed and eaten as is with rice, with shellfish or over fried garlic rice.

List of Philippine condiments
The following is a list of condiments used in Filipino cuisine.

Pickles and fermented sauces

 Atchara - The method of pickling in a vinegar solution, usually a sweet pickling solution. By itself refers to the sweet pickled relish of unripe papaya. Used as a side dish, especially with grilled and fried meat and seafood. 
 Atcharang maasim (sour pickles)
 Atcharang labóng (pickled bamboo shoots)
 Atcharang dampalit (pickled sea purslane)
 Atcharang ubod (pickled palm hearts)
 Atcharang sayote (pickled chayote)
 Ensaladang mangga - green mango relish with tomatoes and onions.
 Bagoong - fermented salted anchovy paste or shrimp paste, particularly popular in the dish kare-kare, binagoongan, and binagoongang kangkong.
 Bagoong alamang (shrimp paste)
 Bagoong guisado - stir-fried bagoong, made with garlic, onions, tomatoes, sugar, and vinegar.
 Bagoong isda (fermented fish)
 Dayok - fermented fish entrails
 Buro, tapay - fermented rice, which can use red yeast rice (angkak). Used mainly as a condiment for steamed/boiled vegetables like okra, sweet potato leaves (talbos ng kamote), eggplant, etc.
Balao-balao - fermented rice with shrimp 
 Burong isda - fermented rice with fish
 Burong mangga - pickled green mangoes. Commonly served with bagoong alamang (shrimp paste)
 Burong mustasa - pickled mustard leaves
 Tinapayan - fermented rice with dried fish
 Patis - Fish sauce. Sometimes spiced with labuyo peppers, or kalamansi lime juice, in which case it is called patismansi.
Taba ng talangka - fermented paste derived from the salted roe and aligue (reddish or orange crab "fat") of the river swimming crabs (talangka). Can be sautéed in garlic and preserved in oil.

Dessert sauces
 Arnibal - syrup made from sugarcane molasses or palm sugar (panutsa)
 Latik - (Visayan usage only) a thick syrup made from coconut milk and sugar.

Flavoring ingredients and seasonings

 Achuete (Annatto oil) - annatto seeds fried in oil which typically turn dishes a bright orange
 Asín tibuok
 Biasong or samuyao (small-fruited papeda)
 Kamias (bilimbi)
 Kasubha (safflower)
 Dayap
 Kiamoy powder
 Kunig or luyang dilaw (turmeric)
 Langkawas (galangal ginger)
 Tanglad (lemongrass)
 Dungon
 Pandan
 Calamansi - small Philippine limes
 Sakurab (sibujing)
 Siling labuyo - small native chili cultivar
 Tabon-tabon

See also
 List of condiments

References

 
Condiments
Philippine cuisine